Kruszyna may refer to the following places in Poland:
Kruszyna, Greater Poland Voivodeship (west-central Poland)
Kruszyna, Łódź Voivodeship (central Poland)
Kruszyna, Lublin Voivodeship (east Poland)
Kruszyna, Lubusz Voivodeship (west Poland)
Kruszyna, Garwolin County in Masovian Voivodeship (east-central Poland)
Kruszyna, Radom County in Masovian Voivodeship (east-central Poland)
Kruszyna, Opole Voivodeship (south-west Poland)
Kruszyna, Pomeranian Voivodeship (north Poland)
Kruszyna, Kościerzyna County in Pomeranian Voivodeship
Kruszyna, Silesian Voivodeship (south Poland)
Kruszyna, Subcarpathian Voivodeship (south-east Poland)